Heinrich Wagner  (9 August 1888, Hamburg  –  24 June 1959, Hamburg) was a German chess master. 

In 1920/21, he won in Kiel. In 1921, he took 8th in Hamburg (the 21st DSB Congress, Erhardt Post won), and won in Hamburg (Quadrangular). In 1922 he tied for 3rd-5th in Oeynhausen (the 22nd DSB–Congress, Post won). In 1923 he tied for 2nd-3rd in Frankfurt (the 23rd DSB–Congress, Ernst Grünfeld won). In 1924, he won ahead of Albert Becker and Carl Carls, in Bremen. In 1925 he tied for 3rd-4th in Breslau (the 24th DSB–Congress, Efim Bogoljubow won).

He shared with Karl Gilg 1st place at Vienna 1926 (DSV Kongress), tied for 3rd-4th at Bremen 1927, won at Hamburg 1928 (Quadrangular), took 2nd behind Herbert Heinicke at Hamburg 1929, shared 4th at Duisburg (the 26th DSB Congress, Carl Ahues), and tied for 6-7th in Swinemünde (Friedrich Sämisch won). In 1932, he took 4th in Hamburg (Kurt Richter won).

He lost a match to Albert Becker (3 : 5) at Hamburg 1924, and won against Herbert Heinicke (8.5 : 3.5) at Hamburg 1930.

Wagner played for Germany in Chess Olympiads.
 In 1927, at fourth board in 1st Chess Olympiad in London (+4 –3 =8);
 In 1928, at first board in 2nd Chess Olympiad in The Hague (+3 –0 =13);
 In 1930, at first reserve board in 3rd Chess Olympiad in Hamburg (+8 –1 =5);
 In 1931, at third board in 4th Chess Olympiad in Prague (+4 –1 =9).
He won team bronze medal at Hamburg 1930.

Wagner was awarded the International Master title in 1953.

References 

German chess players
Chess International Masters
Chess Olympiad competitors
Sportspeople from Hamburg
1888 births
1959 deaths